Kropotkin and the Rise of Revolutionary Anarchism, 1872–1886 is a history book by Caroline Cahm that traces anarchist Peter Kropotkin's ideas and influence within European radicalism and socialism during his life.

Further reading

External links 

 
 

1989 non-fiction books
Cambridge University Press books
Books about Peter Kropotkin
History books about anarchism
English-language books